Brito's goby (Chromogobius britoi) is a species of goby found in the Eastern Atlantic near the coasts of the Canary Islands and Madeira where it occurs at depths of from  on rock outcrops.  This fish inhabits crevices in the rocks.  Males of this species can reach a length of  SL while females only reach  SL. The specific name honours Alberto Brito Hernández (b. 1954) of the University of La Laguna on Tenerife for his numerous contributions to the ichthyology of the Canary Islands.

References

Brito's goby
Fish of the East Atlantic
Vertebrates of the Canary Islands
Fauna of Madeira
Fauna of Portugal
Brito's goby